Glotter  is a river of in the Breisgau region in the south of Baden-Württemberg, Germany which is approximately 30 km long. The spring of this river is located at an altitude of 1040 m amsl on the eastern slope of the Kandel near Neuwelt, a suburb of St. Peter in the Black Forest. It crosses the Glotter dale (in German: Glottertal, which is also the name of a village). Near Riegel am Kaiserstuhl, it discharges into the Dreisam. Near Denzlingen, much of its water is diverted towards the Elz through the stream Lossele.

See also
List of rivers of Baden-Württemberg

References

Rivers of Baden-Württemberg
Rivers of the Black Forest
Rivers of Germany